Undrugonda is a village in Chivvemla mandal of Suryapet district in Telangana, India.

References

Villages in Suryapet district